Bridgetta Tomarchio (born December 25, 1978) is an American actress and model. She is perhaps best known for being the spokesperson for ExtenZe infomercials. Aside from this, she has made various film and television appearances, including: The West Wing, Going to California, Entourage, Californication, Walk a Mile in My Pradas, and The Ideal Husband.

She was born on Christmas Day in Baltimore, Maryland, to parents Mary and Joe. She was raised in nearby Ellicott City.

References

External links

1978 births
Female models from Maryland
American film actresses
American television actresses
Living people
Actresses from Baltimore
People from Ellicott City, Maryland
21st-century American women